Wells Fargo Plaza is the 26th tallest building in San Diego, California and is a prominent fixture in San Diego's skyline. The 23-story skyscraper has a height of 339 ft (103 m) and is located in the Core district of Downtown San Diego. The skyscraper utilizes a modern architectural style and was designed by the architect firm Carrier Johnson Architects.

History
The building was purchased by The Irvine Company in November 2004 for $148 million.

See also
List of tallest buildings in San Diego

References

External links 
Wells Fargo Plaza at Emporis.com
Wells Fargo Plaza at SkyscraperPage.com

Office buildings completed in 1984
Skyscraper office buildings in San Diego
Wells Fargo buildings